Ross Hutchins and Jim Thomas were the defending champions, but they chose to not compete this year.
Nicolas Mahut and Édouard Roger-Vasselin defeated Sergiy Stakhovsky and Lovro Zovko 6–7(4), 6–3, [10–8] in the final.

Seeds

Draw

Draw

References
 Doubles Draw

Doubles
2009